In ring theory, a branch of abstract algebra, a ring homomorphism is a structure-preserving function between two rings. More explicitly, if R and S are rings, then a ring homomorphism is a function  such that f is:

addition preserving:
 for all a and b in R,

multiplication preserving:
 for all a and b in R,

and unit (multiplicative identity) preserving:
.

Additive inverses and the additive identity are part of the structure too, but it is not necessary to require explicitly that they too are respected, because these conditions are consequences of the three conditions above. 

If in addition f is a bijection, then its inverse f−1 is also a ring homomorphism.  In this case, f is called a ring isomorphism, and the rings R and S are called isomorphic. From the standpoint of ring theory, isomorphic rings cannot be distinguished.

If R and S are rngs, then the corresponding notion is that of a rng homomorphism, defined as above except without the third condition f(1R) = 1S.  A rng homomorphism between (unital) rings need not be a ring homomorphism.

The composition of two ring homomorphisms is a ring homomorphism. It follows that the class of all rings forms a category with ring homomorphisms as the morphisms (cf. the category of rings).
In particular, one obtains the notions of ring endomorphism, ring isomorphism, and ring automorphism.

Properties 

Let  be a ring homomorphism. Then, directly from these definitions, one can deduce:
 f(0R) = 0S.
 f(−a) = −f(a) for all a in R.
 For any unit element a in R, f(a) is a unit element such that . In particular, f induces a group homomorphism from the (multiplicative) group of units of R to the (multiplicative) group of units of S (or of im(f)).
 The image of f, denoted im(f), is a subring of S.
 The homomorphism f is injective if and only if .
 If there exists a ring homomorphism  then the characteristic of S divides the characteristic of R.  This can sometimes be used to show that between certain rings R and S, no ring homomorphisms  exists.
 If Rp is the smallest subring contained in R and Sp is the smallest subring contained in S, then every ring homomorphism  induces a ring homomorphism .
 If R is a field (or more generally a skew-field) and S is not the zero ring, then f is injective.
 If both R and S are fields, then im(f) is a subfield of S, so S can be viewed as a field extension of R.
If R and S are commutative and I is an ideal of S then f−1(I) is an ideal of R.
 If R and S are commutative and P is a prime ideal of S then f−1(P) is a prime ideal of R.
If R and S are commutative, M is a maximal ideal of S, and f is surjective, then f−1(M) is a maximal ideal of R.
 If R and S are commutative and S is an integral domain, then ker(f) is a prime ideal of R.
 If R and S are commutative, S is a field, and f is surjective, then ker(f) is a maximal ideal of R.

Moreover,
The composition of ring homomorphisms is a ring homomorphism.
For each ring R, the identity map  is a ring homomorphism.
Therefore, the class of all rings together with ring homomorphisms forms a category, the category of rings.
The zero map  sending every element of R to 0 is a ring homomorphism only if S is the zero ring (the ring whose only element is zero).
 For every ring R, there is a unique ring homomorphism . This says that the ring of integers is an initial object in the category of rings.
 For every ring R, there is a unique ring homomorphism from R to the zero ring.  This says that the zero ring is a terminal object in the category of rings.

Examples 
 The complex conjugation  is a ring homomorphism (this is an example of a ring automorphism).
 For a ring R of prime characteristic p,  is a ring endomorphism called the Frobenius endomorphism.
 If R and S are rings, the zero function from R to S is a ring homomorphism if and only if S is the zero ring.  (Otherwise it fails to map 1R to 1S.)  On the other hand, the zero function is always a rng homomorphism.
 If  is a ring homomorphism between the rings R and S, then f induces a ring homomorphism between the matrix rings .
Let V be a vector space over a field k. More generally, given an abelian group M, a module structure on M over a ring R is equivalent to giving a ring homomorphism .
 A unital algebra homomorphism between unital associative algebras over a commutative ring R is a ring homomorphism that is also R-linear.

Non-examples 
 There is no ring homomorphism  for any .

The category of rings

Endomorphisms, isomorphisms, and automorphisms
 A ring endomorphism is a ring homomorphism from a ring to itself.
 A ring isomorphism is a ring homomorphism having a 2-sided inverse that is also a ring homomorphism.  One can prove that a ring homomorphism is an isomorphism if and only if it is bijective as a function on the underlying sets.  If there exists a ring isomorphism between two rings R and S, then R and S are called isomorphic.  Isomorphic rings differ only by a relabeling of elements.  Example: Up to isomorphism, there are four rings of order 4.  (This means that there are four pairwise non-isomorphic rings of order 4 such that every other ring of order 4 is isomorphic to one of them.)  On the other hand, up to isomorphism, there are eleven rngs of order 4.
 A ring automorphism is a ring isomorphism from a ring to itself.

Monomorphisms and epimorphisms

However, surjective ring homomorphisms are vastly different from epimorphisms in the category of rings.  For example, the inclusion  is a ring epimorphism, but not a surjection. However, they are exactly the same as the strong epimorphisms.

See also 

 Change of rings

Citations

Notes

References 

 

 

Ring theory
Morphisms